Cyril Winston Wilkinson (died 2014) was an Irish badminton player, sixteen time national champion, and badminton coach.

Early and personal life
Wilkinson was a student of Trinity College Dublin from 1959 to 1962.  In 1972, he earned a Masters in Education from Queen's University Belfast, and subsequently completed his Ph.D. in the same institution in 1981, with a thesis on "A consideration of the growth of the concept of the community school, with particular reference to its development since 1930 in Great Britain and the United States of America.".

Sporting career
At the age of twenty, Wilkinson started playing senior interprovincial badminton.  Despite being from Ulster, he was eligible to play for Leinster by virtue of the fact he was a student in Trinity College Dublin.  Footage from 1960 of a doubles match Wilkinson played in against Ulster survives in the Irish Film Institute archive.  That year Wilkinson was first called up to the Ireland national badminton team as a men's doubles player in a Thomas Cup match against Denmark.

The 1960's saw Wilkinson dominate the men's doubles and mixed doubles national titles, with a sole men's single title included for good measure.  Beginning in December 1961, Wilkinson succeeded in the men's singles of the Irish National Badminton Championships.  The semi-finals of that tournament saw him paired against James 'Chick' Doyle, the reigning men's single champion unbeaten since 1953.  Wilkinson received a walkover as Doyle withdrew.  The final saw Wilkinson overcome Lennox Robinson in two sets.

Coaching roles and later life
In the 1980's Wilkinson was an Irish team coach and a senior coach with the Badminton Union of Ireland.  Wilkinson died in 2014 in Spain.

References

Irish male badminton players
2014 deaths
Badminton coaches